Stuart Gilchrist Stewart (26 April 1907 –  26 April 1979) was an Australian rules footballer who played with  in the Victorian Football League (VFL).

Early life
The son of Francis William Stewart (1870–1932) and Margaret Mary Gilchrist Stewart (1885–1962), nee Laidlaw, Stuart Gilchrist Stewart was born in Hamilton on 26 April 1907.

Football
Stewart joined Hawthorn from Ararat at the commencement of the 1926 VFL season. Hard working, energetic and combative, Stewart was one of the best and most consistent players to represent Hawthorn during their inaugural decade in the VFL, being awarded 25 Brownlow Medal votes during his career. Equally at home across half back or in the ruck, Stewart was renowned for his ability to bring down high-flying marks seemingly regardless of the risk. He represented Victoria on 5 occasions. 

In 1936, Stewart became playing-coach of the Hawthorn seconds.

Later life
In 1934 he married Beatrice Florence Bardon and they lived in Hawthorn.

Stewart later served in the Australian Army during World War II.

In the early 1950s they moved to Brisbane, where they lived until his death in 1979.

Honours and achievements
Individual
 Hawthorn life member

References

External links 

1907 births
1979 deaths
Australian rules footballers from Victoria (Australia)
Hawthorn Football Club players
People from Hamilton, Victoria
Ararat Football Club players